Social Justice Coalition may refer to:
 Social Justice Coalition (2014), an Egyptian electoral alliance formed in 2014 for the 2014 parliamentary election
 Social Justice Coalition (Egypt), an Egyptian electoral alliance formed in 2012 for the 2014 parliamentary election
 Social Justice Coalition (South Africa), a South African NGO